Adamawa  is one of the 36 states in Nigeria, located in the North eastern part of Nigeria and its capital city is Yola. This list of tertiary institutions in Adamawa State includes universities, polytechnics and colleges that are owned by Federal Government, State Government and private individuals.

Universities in Adamawa State
American University of Nigeria
Modibbo Adama Federal University of Technology, Yola
Adamawa State University

Colleges and Polytechnics in Adamawa State
Adamawa State Polytechnic, Yola
Federal Polytechnic, Mubi
Federal College of Education, Yola

References

Education in Adamawa State
Adamawa